Fallout 2: A Post Nuclear Role Playing Game is a 1998 role-playing video game developed by Black Isle Studios and published by Interplay Productions. It is a sequel to Fallout (1997), featuring similar graphics and game mechanics. The game's story takes place in 2241, 80 years after the events of Fallout and 164 years after the atomic war which reduced the vast majority of the world to a nuclear wasteland. The player assumes the role of The Chosen One, the grandchild of the first game's protagonist, and undertakes a quest to save their small village on the West Coast of the United States.

Fallout 2 was well received by critics, who praised its gameplay and storyline, and considered it a worthy successor to the original Fallout. Its bugs and limited updates to the formula of the first game attracted criticism. In 2008, the game received a direct sequel: Fallout 3, developed by Bethesda Game Studios.

Gameplay

Fallout 2 is a role-playing open-world video game. The player is free to move at will until they enter into combat. Combat gives them a number of action points to move, fire, check their equipment, reload and the like.

When a player uses up all of their action points, they end their turn and enemies start theirs. If the player survives unharmed, he or she has their action points restored. Injuries and poisons can reduce the number of action points available both in a single turn and semi-permanently, until combat ends and the player can be treated.

Combat and completion of jobs or quests reward the player with experience points with which they can level up their characters and apply beneficial perks to become more suited to the dangerous post-apocalyptic world.

General gameplay consists of traveling and interacting with local inhabitants and organizations to complete goals and aid or inhibit the NPCs. The player's actions dictate what future story or gameplay opportunities are available. Mature themes such as alcohol consumption, drug usage, and sex are present.

Organized crime, prostitution, and slavery are major elements of the setting. Character creation is based on the SPECIAL role-playing system.

Plot
In 2241, the primitive town of Arroyo suffers the worst drought on record. Faced with the calamity, the village elder asks the direct descendant of the Vault Dweller, referred to as the Chosen One, to perform the quest of retrieving a Garden of Eden Creation Kit (GECK) for Arroyo. The GECK is a device that can create thriving communities out of the post-apocalyptic wasteland. The player, assuming the role of the Chosen One, is given nothing more than the Vault Dweller's jumpsuit, a RobCo PIPBoy 2000, a Vault 13 water flask, a spear and some cash to start on their mission.

The Chosen One eventually finds Vault 13, the supposed location of a GECK, devoid of the majority of its former human inhabitants and instead inhabited by intelligent Deathclaws. The Chosen One then returns to find their village captured by the deep state remnants of the United States government known as "The Enclave". The Enclave often terrorizes the inhabitants of the continental United States with their supreme arsenal of advanced technology. The Chosen One, through various means, activates an ancient oil tanker and engages its autopilot, thus allowing them to reach the Enclave's main base on an offshore oil rig. It is revealed that the dwellers of Vault 13 were captured as well, to be used as test subjects for the Forced Evolutionary Virus (FEV). Vault 13 was supposed to be closed for 200 years as part of a government experiment, making them perfect test subjects. The Enclave modified the FEV into an airborne disease, designed to attack any living creatures with mutated DNA through a jet stream. With all genetic impurities removed, the Enclave (who remain protected from radiation) could take over. The Chosen One frees both their fellow villagers from Arroyo and the Vault 13 dwellers from Enclave control and subsequently destroys the Enclave's oil rig, killing Dick Richardson, the President of the United States, as well as a genetically modified Secret Service enforcer named Frank Horrigan. In the end, the inhabitants of Vault 13 and the Arroyo villagers create a new prosperous community with the help of the GECK.

Development
Tim Cain announced Fallout 2 via a Usenet posting in December 1997, and wrote that it "should take 11 months". Cain later clarified that the sequel entered development before the launch of Fallout, as the previous game had "really caused a buzz in the studio about six months before it was released". According to co-founder of Black Isle Studios Feargus Urquhart, Interplay was experiencing financial difficulties at the beginning of 1998, which according to Urquhart, gave the studio "basically nine months to make the whole game". In order to reach this deadline, many staff were taken from the Planescape: Torment development team and made to work on Fallout 2. Additionally, the development team were also made to work crunch time to make up for a lack of manpower and time.

Reception

Fallout 2 received positive reviews, according to the review aggregators Metacritic and GameRankings. It was a finalist for the "role-playing game of the year" awards from Computer Gaming World, GameSpot, CNET Gamecenter, IGN and the Academy of Interactive Arts & Sciences, all of which ultimately went to Baldur's Gate. The editors of GameSpot wrote, "A bigger, better Fallout, this sequel to 1997's RPG of the Year was populated with more characters, more places to go, and more things to do."

Positive reviewers praised the gameplay, storyline, and worthiness as a successor to the original Fallout, while detractors criticized frequent bugs and lack of improvement over the first game. Daniel Morris of GamePro praised the mix of action and character interaction as well as the non-linear gameplay. IGN applauded the developers for the sizable game world, the writing, and "not fixing something that wasn't broken." Game Revolution praised the game's depth and storyline but criticized its graphics and interface.

Sales
Fallout 2 was a commercial success. In the United States, it secured third place on PC Data's computer game sales rankings for the first week of November 1998. It was absent from the weekly top 10 by the following week, but debuted at #20 for the month of November overall. Fallout 2 sold 123,000 copies in the United States by March 2000. GameSpot writer Desslock considered these "very good sales, especially since the overall [worldwide] figures are likely double those amounts." According to Keza MacDonald of Eurogamer, Fallout 2 was unsuccessful in the United Kingdom; she noted that the game and its predecessor totaled just over 50,000 sales combined in the region.

Legacy
In 2013, GamesRadar ranked Fallout 2 number 68 on their list of top video games of all time. That same year, IGN ranked it as the 28th best role-playing video game ever. In 2015, PC Gamer ranked the game #3 on its list of best RPGs of all time.

In retrospect, the designers of Fallout 2 expressed reservations about the game, with Chris Avellone calling it "a slapdash project without a lot of oversight". Retro Gamer described Fallout 2 as "an impressive feat, yet still one that rubbed Fallout diehards the wrong way."

Fallout 2 was the first ever game to feature same sex marriage, and one of the first games to include LGBTQ+ representation in general.

References

External links
 
 Fallout 2 at the Internet Movie Database
 

1998 video games
Anti-war video games
Black Isle Studios games
Censored video games
Fallout (series) video games
Interplay Entertainment games
MacOS games
Open-world video games
Organized crime video games
Role-playing video games
Single-player video games
Video games about slavery
Video games featuring protagonists of selectable gender
Video games scored by Mark Morgan
Video games set in the 23rd century
Video games set in California
Video games set in Nevada
Video games set in Oregon
Video games set in San Francisco
Video games set in the United States
Video games with alternate endings
Video games with isometric graphics
Windows games
Video games developed in the United States